Small Asian mongoose is a common name applied to two mammals which were formerly considered to be a single species:

Javan mongoose
Small Indian mongoose

Mammal common names